John Calvin Fleming Jr. (born July 5, 1951) is an American politician, physician, military veteran, and businessman. After leaving Congress in 2017, he served for two years in the administration as Deputy Assistant Secretary for Health Information Technology Reform and then served as Assistant Secretary of Commerce for Economic Development from March 2019 to 2020. In March 2020, he was appointed to a position in the White House as Assistant to the President for Planning and Implementation.

From January 3, 2009, to January 3, 2017, Fleming was the representative for Louisiana's 4th congressional district. He resides in the city of Minden in Webster Parish in northwestern Louisiana. A second cousin (five generations removed) to the former House Speaker Henry Clay of Kentucky, Fleming is a member of Sons of the American Revolution and Jamestowne Society. He was the second Republican to hold his House seat since Reconstruction.

Early life, education and family

Fleming was born in Meridian in Lauderdale County in eastern Mississippi. He was reared in a working-class home. While he was still young, his mother became disabled and could no longer work. Fleming graduated from Meridian High School in 1969. Just prior to Fleming's high school graduation, Fleming's father died of a heart attack. This forced him to finance his education with odd jobs and loans. Fleming attended the University of Mississippi at Oxford, where he was a member of the Phi Delta Theta Fraternity. He graduated with a Bachelor of Science degree in 1973. He later attended medical school at the Jackson campus of the same university, earning an M.D. in 1976. In 1979, Fleming completed a Family Medicine residency with the United States Navy. Subsequently, Fleming stayed in the Navy another three years, serving until 1982 when he moved his family to and set up a private family medicine practice in Minden, Louisiana. He has served as a deacon, Sunday school teacher, and Sunday school department director at First Baptist of Minden.

Fleming also trained for years in karate attaining the rank of third-degree black belt. He took his first piano lesson at age 43 and ultimately studied for 14 years afterwards, playing the occasional recital and concert. Fleming and his wife, Cindy, married in 1978. The couple has four children.

Medical career
Fleming was chief resident in Family Medicine at the Naval Regional Medical Center in Camp Pendleton, California. He also trained at the drug and alcohol treatment unit at the Navy Regional Medical Center in Long Beach, California. Serving in the Navy after his residency, Fleming practiced family medicine on the island of Guam. From 1979 to 1981, he was the director of drug and alcohol treatment and chairman of the Navy Family Advocacy Committee. He subsequently performed similar duties in Charleston, South Carolina.

After leaving the Navy, Fleming established a practice in Minden in August 1982. His first clinic was on Pearl Street across from the United States Post Office. He chose Minden for his city of residence because, in his words, it "has small-town charm, warm essence of life, long, lazy summer days with watermelon cuts and family reunions." To attract patients to his new practice, Fleming announced evening and Saturday morning hours to accommodate working people and students.

Fleming is board certified by the American Board of Family Medicine He joined the staff of the Minden Medical Center. Fleming is also a member of the American Academy of Family Physicians (AAFP) and the Louisiana Academy of Family Physicians (LAFP). In 2007, he was chosen as the LAFP "Louisiana Family Practice Physician of the Year."

Fleming previously worked with drug-dependent persons through the program called "New Beginnings" at the Minden Medical Center. In 1994, the Minden Press-Herald revealed Dr. Fleming's call "to end violence and drug addiction. I link these two together because I believe most of the violence we see is caused by addiction to, or buying and selling of drugs."

In 2006, Fleming wrote Preventing Addiction: What Parents Must Know to Immunize Their Kids Against Drug And Alcohol Addiction. In the book, Fleming argues that alcohol, among other addicting substances, can serve as a gateway for broader and more problematic drug use, and that the immature brain development of children makes them vulnerable to drug addiction later in life. Therefore, delaying the use of alcohol and other addicting substances until later adolescence or adulthood can sharply reduce the risk of later addiction according to scientific studies initiated by the National Institute on Drug Abuse and others.

On August 22, 2019, Dr. Fleming was given the Distinguished Alumnus of the Year Award by the University of Mississippi Medical Center.

Business career
Fleming started a suite of diverse businesses and commercial real estate ventures during the mid 1980s. His business interests stretch from Brownsville, Texas to Oxford, Mississippi with corporate centers in Killeen and Houston in Texas and Shreveport/Bossier City in Louisiana. He owns over thirty-six Subway individually franchised sandwich shops in north Louisiana employing over 500 Louisianans. Among several other franchised concepts, he also owns Fleming Expansions, LLC, a regional developer and master franchise for The UPS Store, with over 182 outlets in Louisiana, Mississippi and Texas.

Webster Parish coroner
In 1995, Fleming ran for coroner defeating the nonpartisan candidate, Dr. Carlos A. Irizarry, 7,842 votes (60.4 percent) to 5,143 (39.6 percent). Fleming succeeded Democratic incumbent Dr. Carl A. Hines, from Minden, who did not seek re-election. He served from 1996 to 2000.

U.S. House of Representatives

Elections

2008

Fleming entered the race for the District 4 House seat after the 21-year Republican incumbent Jim McCrery announced his retirement from the House. He received political support from the LAFP and the American Academy of Family Physicians' (AAFP) political action committee for his campaign. Fleming supported the FairTax, which would eliminate the federal income tax and replace it with a flat sales tax. In the October 4, 2008, Republican closed primary, Fleming ran against Jeff R. Thompson, a lawyer from Bossier City, and Chris Gorman. In the election, no candidate received a majority of the votes. Fleming led with 14,500 votes (35.1 percent), followed by Gorman with 14,072 votes (34.1 percent), and Thompson with 12,693 votes (30.8 percent). This established a primary runoff between Fleming and Gorman. In the runoff, Fleming defeated Gorman, 43,012 votes (55.6 percent) to 34,405 (44.4 percent) and carried all but one of the thirteen parishes in the district.

Outgoing Vice President Dick Cheney appeared in Shreveport on November 21 to speak at a fundraiser for Fleming. Politico.com indicated that McCrery supports Fleming but had made no official endorsement and had not appeared at any of Fleming's campaign events. On December 2, McCrery spoke on Fleming's behalf in an appearance on The Moon Griffon Show radio program, which is syndicated in most Louisiana media markets. He used the argument that Carmouche, if successful, would cast his first vote for Speaker Nancy Pelosi of California. On December 10, 2008, Paul Carmouche formally conceded the election to Fleming.

2010

Fleming was unopposed in the Republican primary in 2010 but was challenged by the Democratic nominee, David R. Melville. Governor Buddy Roemer, a former Democrat, then a Republican and later a failed candidate for the 2012 Republican presidential nomination; supported David Melville, his brother-in-law, in the general election. Fleming was reelected saying that Democratic policies were out of step with his district and most of America.

2012

Fleming was unopposed by a Democratic candidate in his 2012 re-election bid in his district that is 2 to 1 Democratic registration but had a Cook PVI of R +11. In the November 6, 2012, general election, Fleming instead faced opposition from a Libertarian candidate, Randall Lord of Shreveport, a former chiropractor studying psychology at Louisiana State University in Shreveport. Fleming defeated Lord, 187,790 (75.3 percent) to 61,587 (24.7 percent). Lord was subsequently sentenced to 46 months in federal prison for financial scams related to illegal narcotic drug distribution.

2014

On April 4, 2013, Fleming announced that he would not in 2014 seek the United States Senate held since 1997 by the Democratic Mary Landrieu. Instead his colleague, U.S. Representative Bill Cassidy of Baton Rouge, had announced on April 3 that he would challenge Landrieu. In his statement, Fleming said: "For me to enter the race now would risk a contest between two experienced Republican congressmen, potentially offering Senator Landrieu a path back to Washington. I can't let that happen."

On December 10, 2014, KTBS, a Shreveport based ABC television station, reported that Fleming was considering running for the Senate seat held by David Vitter, who ran in the 2015 gubernatorial election. Vitter would have had to vacate his seat had he been elected as governor. In a statement, Fleming said "If Senator Vitter is elected as Governor, I would certainly be interested in running for the seat he would vacate."

2016

On December 7, 2015, Fleming officially announced his candidacy for the United States Senate. He was a candidate to succeed fellow Republican David Vitter, who did not seek a third term in 2016. Vitter lost the gubernatorial runoff election on November 21, 2015, to the Democrat John Bel Edwards. Others who sought the Senate seat that Vitter vacated were Fleming's House colleague and fellow physician, Charles Boustany of Lafayette, former Ku Klux Klan leader David Duke, Foster Campbell of Bossier Parish, a Democratic member of the Louisiana Public Service Commission and an advisor to John Bel Edwards, Democrat Caroline Fayard, and State Treasurer John Neely Kennedy of Madisonville, the ultimate winner of the position.

"I not only fought the liberals in Washington, I also fought the leadership of my own party when they were all too willing to compromise on our conservative principles," Fleming said in his statement of candidacy. Fleming finished in fifth place in the primary election with 204,026 votes (11 percent), just behind the Democrat Caroline Fayard. He amassed pluralities in seven parishes, six of which are in his House district: Bossier, Claiborne, Grant, Lincoln (Louisiana's 5th congressional district), Sabine, Webster, and Vernon.

Congressional tenure

Fleming served four two-year terms in the United States House of Representatives from January 3, 2009, to January 3, 2017. The Congressman was on stage with many other dignitaries and congressional members at the first inauguration of Barack Obama, on January 20, 2009. Mamie Love Wallace, one of Fleming's constituents who was an early activist in the Civil Rights Movement, was his special guest at the event. Fleming's wife, Cindy, gave Mrs. Wallace her spouse's seat on the platform in her honor.

Legislation authored

Federal Duck Stamp
Fleming served on the Committee on Natural Resources and chaired the Subcommittee on Fisheries, Wildlife, Oceans and Insular Affairs. As such he introduced legislation to raise the price of the Federal Duck Stamp by $10 to $25, bringing the stamp in line with inflation as an increase had not occurred for many years. The purpose of the legislation was to preserve habitat in critical migratory waterfowl flyways to allow duck populations to grow. The legislation was supported by hunting groups, including Ducks Unlimited, the National Rifle Association, and the Theodore Roosevelt Conservation Partnership. For his work on the Committee on Natural Resources on behalf of migratory birds, Fleming was given an award by Ducks Unlimited and the 2014 North American Migratory Bird Joint Venture Champion award for a Legislator by the Association of Joint Venture Management Boards. The Fleming Duck Stamp bill passed the House and Senate by voice vote and was signed into law by President Obama on December 18, 2014, as it had broad bipartisan support. Hunters and conservationists liked it as it generated more revenue to preserve habitat for waterfowl. Conservatives supported it because all additional revenues were dedicated to land easements rather than federalizing private land.

Amtrak Secure Transportation of Firearms
On October 13, 2009, Fleming introduced the Amtrak Secure Transportation of Firearms Act. It was supported by the National Rifle Association. The bill passed the House and Senate and was signed into law by President Obama in December 2009.

Conscience Protection Act of 2016
On March 22, 2016, Fleming introduced the Conscience Protection Act of 2016 which "amends the Public Health Service Act to codify the prohibition against the federal government and state and local governments that receive federal financial assistance for health-related activities penalizing or discriminating against a health care provider based on the provider's refusal to be involved in, or provide coverage for, abortion." If enacted it would give access to courts (heretofore unavailable) by healthcare providers who feel they have been discriminated against because of their refusal (based on conscience) to provide abortion services. For legislative expediency the text was put into a Senate shell bill
S. 304. It was ultimately passed by the House and Senate, but President Obama refused to sign it into law.

The Abortion Non-Discrimination Act (ANDA)
By federal law, federal funding is required to be withheld from states who do not enforce the Weldon Amendment that prevents discrimination against healthcare providers if they refuse to provide abortion services. In 2014, California began enforcing a 1975 state law requiring all insurance companies to charge and cover all subscribers for abortion services, even if they object based on religious or conscience beliefs. Fleming and other Republicans accused President Obama of failing to enforce the Weldon Amendment. Fleming introduced legislation to provide health insurance subscribers a choice to purchase plans that do not cover abortions.

Seniors' Tax Simplification Act of 2015
With each congressional session, Fleming introduced this bill designed to improve convenience and lower tax-filing costs to seniors. Though a senior's income may be limited to only Social Security benefits, the IRS requires all senior citizens to use the long form 1040 to file taxes. This act was designed to reduce the senior taxpayer filing to one simple page saving time, complexity and cost.

H. Res. 615 of 2009
In 2009, Fleming introduced H. Res. 615, "expressing the sense of the House of Representatives that members who vote in favor of the establishment of a public, federal government-run health insurance option are urged to forgo their right to participate in the Federal Employees Health Benefits Program (FEHBP) and agree to enroll under that public option." The resolution created a public outcry, after an interview of Fleming by Fox News' Meghan Kelly, demanding that members of Congress should also be subject to Obamacare. Consequently, language was placed in the Affordable Care Act requiring members of Congress and their staff to leave the more affordable Federal Employees Health Benefits Program with much lower premiums and deductibles, and obtain healthcare insurance through the DC Exchange, a product of the Affordable Care Act.

American Health Care Reform Act of 2013
Fleming was a vocal critic of the Affordable Care Act (ACA), which was signed into law in 2010 and was the subject of more than 50 repeal attempts by the Republican-controlled House. Realizing that Democrats would ultimately demand the elimination of the private insurance market and demand a government-run, single-payer health care system, Fleming called the ACA "the most dangerous piece of legislation ever passed by Congress." When asked about fixing the healthcare law instead of repealing it, he said it was "not fixable or repairable." Fleming helped write, cosponsored and introduced the Republican Study Committee's American Health Care Reform Act of 2013, which was re-introduced in 2015. The legislation would have repealed the ACA and the health care provisions of the Health Care and Education Reconciliation Act of 2010 and implemented different health care related provisions.

Tax cuts and increases 
In a September 19, 2011, interview on MSNBC in which Fleming was critical of President Obama's proposed plan to increase taxes, he was questioned about the reported $6.3 million of gross revenues his private restaurant company received the previous year. Fleming responded to host Chris Jansing by saying, "that's before you pay 500 employees, you pay rent, you pay equipment, and food" (business overhead); "the actual net income was a mere fraction of that...It is more like $600,000 of that $6.3 million...So by the time I feed my family I have, maybe $400,000 left over to invest in new locations, upgrade my locations, buy more equipment." When Jansing asked Fleming if he thought the "average person" might be unsympathetic to Fleming's position, Fleming responded, "Class warfare never created a job...This is not about attacking people who make certain incomes. You know in this country, most people feel that being successful in their business is a virtue, not a vice, and once we begin to identify it as a vice, this country is going down."

Fleming's remarks were widely reported and resulted in considerable commentary. Bruce Alpert, of Louisiana newspaper The Times-Picayune, reported that "on liberal blogs, Fleming was portrayed as insensitive to millions of working Americans who are struggling to meet expenses in the face of high unemployment and stagnant wages." Conservative sources including Bill O'Reilly and the Drudge Report defended Fleming's remarks. Josh Beavers, publisher of the Minden Press-Herald in Fleming's hometown, wrote an editorial which stated, "[Fleming's] sentiment was only that the more taxes he pays the fewer people he can employ. High taxes on business owners thwart economic activity."

Activities in Congress led by Fleming

Co-founder of the House Freedom Caucus
Fleming, in addition to being among the nine founding members of the House Freedom Caucus, also served on the first Freedom Caucus board of directors and led the effort to impeach the Commissioner of the IRS.

Attempt to impeach the Commissioner of the IRS
Soon after the Tea Party Movement began in 2009, local and national Tea Party organizations began to complain that the IRS would not approve their applications for tax exempt status, a certification necessary for the viability of nonprofit organizations. In 2013, Lois Lerner, a high level IRS employee, disclosed as Director of Rulings and Agreements in the Exempt Organizations, that the conservative Tea Party organizations were targeted by the IRS to be denied tax exempt status while liberal groups were given the appropriate certifications. This created the appearance that Lerner was using her power in the IRS for political and ideological benefit. Because of the IRS targeting controversy, Lerner was forced to retire and John Koskinen was appointed to replace the acting Commissioner to restore integrity of the IRS.

Investigations into the IRS targeting controversy were held by the House Oversight Committee, chaired by Jason Chaffetz. Koskinen was instructed to protect and turn over all records relating to the controversy. However, under Koskinen, the vast amount of documentation, including computer backup tapes, were destroyed. Chaffetz issued a document to begin impeachment proceedings against Koskinen saying, "he failed to comply with a congressionally issued subpoena, documents were destroyed on his watch, and the public was consistently misled. Impeachment is the appropriate tool to restore public confidence in the IRS and to protect the institutional interests of Congress." However, Republican House leadership did not bring the impeachment to the floor for a vote.

With the support of the House Freedom Caucus, Fleming utilized a rarely used parliamentary procedure called a privileged motion to force a vote on impeachment of Koskinen. Fleming went to the floor of the House and read the motion on July 13, 2016, after filing it in writing the day before. Though the motion required a vote on impeachment, House leadership and the Freedom Caucus negotiated a compromise for Koskinen to return for an additional hearing to learn more about his actions in the scandal. Koskinen returned, voluntarily, on September 21, 2016, to face an impeachment hearing during which he admitted to his "failings" in getting to the bottom of the IRS targeting controversy.

Social media to connect with constituents 
As Fleming entered Congress in 2009, use of social media such as Facebook and Twitter emerged as methods for members to connect directly with their constituents. In 2010, the House Republican Conference created the "New Media Challenge" to spur Republican members to acquire more followers. Fleming was awarded first place in both 2010 ad 2011 by his Republican peers.

Work on religion in the military
Beginning about 2005, critics claimed that Christians in the military caught proselytizing should be court-martialed. Subsequently, military members came forward claiming they were being punished by their military superiors for what they viewed as reasonable religious expression, a violation of the First Amendment. In June 2013, Fleming sponsored an amendment to the 2014 National Defense Authorization Act requiring the military "to accommodate, except in cases of military necessity, actions and speech, reflecting the conscience, moral principles, or religious beliefs of the member." The amendment drew objections from the White House, with a spokesman saying that commanders need discretion to, "address potentially problematic speech and actions within their units" and that the measure would "have a significant adverse effect on good order, discipline, morale and mission accomplishment." The amendment passed with a bipartisan vote by the House Armed Services Committee. A similar measure passed the Senate and compromise language was adopted into the final NDAA signed into law.

During 2013, attempts were made by an atheist to join the military as a chaplain. In July 2013, the U.S. House passed a measure, sponsored by Fleming, that bars the Defense Department from appointing atheist chaplains. Fleming said, "The notion of an atheist chaplain is nonsensical; it's an oxymoron." Democratic Congressman Rob Andrews of New Jersey said that it was "wrong" to tell an irreligious service member that they "must go to a mental health professional in order to receive counseling, rather than someone who comes from their philosophical faith or tradition." Fleming ended the debate by saying, "an atheist chaplain is the last person in the world that a dying soldier should meet with when they need that last moment of counseling in their life." The amendment passed into the 2014 House DOD appropriations bill For his work on religious freedom and material support of the military chaplaincy during his tenure on the House Armed Services Committee, Fleming was given the first ever Torchbearer for Religious Freedom award in 2014, by the Chaplain Alliance for Religious Liberty.

Israel
Fleming, while in Congress, was a strong supporter of Israel. Like most members of Congress during their freshman term, he visited Israel courtesy of the American Israel Education Foundation, a non-profit affiliate of the AIPAC. However, he returned to Israel in November 2011 with a small group of Congressmen as a member of the Congressional Israel Allies Caucus, meeting with high level Israeli leaders and learning more about important issues impacting Israel and the Jewish people courtesy of the US Israel Educational Foundation.

Long Range Strike Caucus
In 2009 Fleming co-chaired this bipartisan congressional caucus to "sustain both the land- and sea-based long range strike capabilities."

Addiction, Treatment and Recovery Caucus 
Fleming, based on his training, experience and interest, was the Republican co-chair of this bipartisan congressional caucus that promotes addiction treatment and prevention.

House Values Action Team (VAT)
Fleming served as co-chair of VAT, a House caucus, that met regularly with interest groups in support of legislation and court decisions that are pro-life and pro-traditional family.

2012 abortion post 
In 2012, Fleming attracted attention when an article from the satirical news source The Onion (titled "Planned Parenthood Opens $8 Billion Abortionplex") was posted on his Facebook page with the apparently sincere message, "More on Planned Parenthood, abortion by wholesale". The post was deleted after commenters highlighted the article's satirical nature.

Budget Control Act of 2011 and budget sequestration of 2013
After Republicans took control of the United States House of Representatives In 2011, a debate emerged over how to bring deficit spending under control after it ballooned to over $1.3 trillion annually from 2009 to 2011. A compromise deal was struck, called the Budget Control Act of 2011, between Republican Speaker John Boehner and President Obama that would create a bipartisan and bicameral "super committee" in Congress to decide how to equitably lower discretionary spending. According to the act, automatic and substantial cuts would be made to both national defense and non-defense discretionary spending in the federal budget if the committee did not come to an agreement to specific and targeted budget cuts. The "super committee" could not come to an agreement leading to the automatic cuts to national defense and domestic spending. Fleming opposed and voted against the Budget Control Act of 2011 as he feared it would ultimately lead to devastating cuts to national defense, which it did.

Fleming was quoted in Forbes as saying: "Republicans in general, we desperately want a reduction in spending to get government back into balance. We would rather take some cuts in areas that we are not comfortable with than have no cuts at all." Forbes noted that Fleming's district includes Barksdale Air Force Base and Fort Polk, both major military installations. At a discussion in February 2013 in DeRidder; Fleming, a military veteran, stated he would not vote to allow the government to cut $600 million from the defense budget. Fleming was well known to be a supporter of the military and its personnel and the need to reverse the devastating cuts since the Budget Control Act of 2011 was implemented. He was quoted as saying, "One way my service in the military changes the way I do my job is that I understand our next conflict is not a matter of 'if' but 'when,' and that we need to equip our military with the resources and tools they need to protect our nation at home and abroad."
Fleming voted against the Budget Control Act of 2011, that caused the automatic budget sequestration in March 2013.
On November 21, 2011, Fleming criticized the Budget Control Act because of what he called "devastating cuts to military spending."

Political positions

Abortion
Fleming was a staunch opponent of abortion. Fleming voted to bar federal funds from being used for any health benefits coverage including coverage of abortion. Fleming also voted to remove federal funding from Planned Parenthood. Fleming was a cosponsor of the Sanctity of Human Life Act, which declared that "each human life begins with fertilization."

Affordable Care Act
Fleming supported the company Hobby Lobby in its legal challenge to the application of the Affordable Care Act's contraceptive mandate to the company; the Supreme Court of the United States ultimately ruled in favor of the company in Burwell v. Hobby Lobby Stores, Inc..

Other social issues
Fleming, a member of the House Armed Services Committee, proposed an amendment to the fiscal year 2014 National Defense Authorization Act (NDAA) providing that "Except in cases of military necessity, the Armed Forces shall accommodate the beliefs, actions, and speech" of members of the armed forces. This amendment was supported by Christian Conservative groups such as the Family Research Council, which asserted that religious freedom was under attack in the military, and opposed by atheist groups such as the Military Religious Freedom Foundation and the Military Association of Atheists and Freethinkers, which asserted that the amendment was unconstitutional and would enable harassment of LGBT people in the military.

Same-sex marriage
In 2012, before the Obergefell v. Hodges Supreme Court decision, Fleming condemned a marriage-like ceremony that took place at Fort Polk, Louisiana, between an enlisted woman and civilian woman. (Fort Polk, a U.S. Army base, lies within Fleming's congressional district.) Fleming said that the ceremony "should not have occurred at Fort Polk, especially since the people of Louisiana have made it abundantly clear that our state does not recognize same-sex marriages or civil unions" and characterized the event as part of a "liberal social experiment with our military."

Fleming condemned the Supreme Court's 2015 decision of Obergefell v. Hodges, which found a constitutional right to same-sex marriage. Fleming stated that he was "greatly disappointed" and disagreed with the decision. Fleming was also a co-sponsor of The First Amendment Defense Act, a bill designed to protect religious institutions from being forced to perform marriage or other ceremonies that violate their teachings.

Donald Trump 
In August 2016, Fleming made the case that Donald Trump was a true conservative candidate for president and ultimately endorsed him in September 2016. On August 15, 2016, Fleming said, “I just have to say based on what I’ve seen and witnessed in the campaign, I’d say he fits much closer to the values of conservatives and the Republican party than anybody who’s run for office in the past several decades.”

Committee assignments
Upon his election to the United States House of Representatives, Fleming was assigned to these committees:
 Committee on Armed Services,
 Subcommittee on Tactical Air and Land Forces
 Subcommittee on Strategic Forces;
 Committee on Natural Resources,
 Subcommittee on Energy and Mineral Resources
 Subcommittee on Fisheries, Wildlife, Oceans and Insular Affairs (Chairman)

Caucus memberships
 The Republican Study Committee
 The Tea Party Caucus
 The Israel Allies Caucus
 Co-chair of the Congressional Addiction, Treatment and Recovery Caucus
Co-chair of the House Values Action Team (VAT)
 Co-founder of the House Freedom Caucus
 Co-chair of the GOP Doctors Caucus
Co-chair and founder of the Long Range Strike Caucus
 Congressional Constitution Caucus 
Congressional Arts Caucus

Department of Health and Human Services tenure
After completing four terms in the United States House of Representatives, Fleming was appointed Deputy Assistant Secretary of Health Technology Reform in Health and Human Services on March 23, 2017 by President Donald Trump. On being appointed, Fleming said that his goals were to remove barriers to health care innovation and to promote greater usability and interoperability of healthcare information technology systems. Fleming lamented the fractured nature of electronic health record technology and said that he supported "every American having a single, unified health record that resides in the cloud." Fleming advocated the use of accountable care organizations in addition to the fee for service system still dominant in U.S. health care, and called for more pay-for-value systems tied to the collection and use of data. He said he planned "to advocate policies that would encourage physicians to use technology in their medical practice." He hoped "to remove barriers to data transfer."

He was assigned to the Office of the National Coordinator, an agency within HHS. Not only was Dr. Fleming among few physicians in Congress during his tenure, but he implemented the first private practice EHR in Louisiana in 1997. His private medical practice was fully paperless by 1999. As a result, it was felt by the Trump administration that he would be a perfect fit for ONC. Fleming's work was primarily focused in the area of streamlining required workflow in the use of technology and the reduction of health care clinician burden. He noted that various studies have shown that as much as 50% of clinician work flow is spent inputting data into EHRs. He explained that the cause of this burden is due primarily to three major areas: outdated clinical record guideline requirements designed for billing purposes, prior authorization requirements, and health care quality measurement and reporting. He anticipated that a new, rapidly developing clinician burden in response to the nationwide opioid crisis, PDMPs, will need better design and streamlining as they are being implemented. While serving in the Office of the National Coordinator Fleming led an effort, working with CMS, to modernize CMS's 2019 physician fee schedule to reduce the need for low value, time-consuming, potentially inaccurate, and excessively documented medical records primarily for billing purposes. He also worked closely with government and private sector organizations to bring automation to the prior authorization process. Finally, he called for merging state and regional PDMPs into a single national database, easily accessible by clinicians with proper authorization and privacy security.

Department of Commerce tenure
On June 20, 2018, President Trump nominated Fleming to serve as Assistant Secretary of Commerce for Economic Development, leading the Economic Development Administration. His appointment was approved by a vote of 15–5 in the United States Senate Committee on Environment and Public Works on August 1, 2018. On March 7, 2019, his nomination was confirmed by a vote of 67–30 in the full senate. After assuming office, Fleming promoted the benefits of the new tax law, Tax Cuts and Jobs Act of 2017; especially the Opportunity Zone portion as a new EDA tool to enhance the agency's effectiveness in revitalizing economically depressed communities. His stated goal for the EDA: "We don't try to make successful communities more successful. We want to make uncertain, unsuccessful communities successful, and hopefully even more successful over time." Fleming left his position in March 2020 upon his appointment to a position at the White House.

Potential candidate for governor, 2019
Sources close to Fleming said that he considered entering the nonpartisan blanket primary on October 12, 2019 against Democratic Governor John Bel Edwards, a candidate for a second term. Columnist Sam Hanna, Jr., of the Ouachita Citizen weekly newspaper in West Monroe, said that Fleming could run because neither of the two announced Republican candidates, U.S. Representative Ralph Abraham of Louisiana's 5th congressional district or Baton Rouge businessman Eddie Rispone, had yet to make much impact toward unseating Edwards. Fleming ultimately chose not to run, however.

Assistant to the President
On March 23, 2020, Fleming was detailed from his position as Assistant Secretary of the Economic Development Administration and appointed as Assistant to the President for Planning and Implementation at the White House, a senior staff position. He functioned as the Deputy Chief of Staff as his office was in the Chief of Staff complex of offices and he managed day to day duties and responsibilities of the office not otherwise handled by Mark Meadows. Additional duties and functions included serving on the White House Coronavirus Task Force as well as leading a presidential team to review and write a presidential report on lessons learned from the pandemic. Before leaving office he was given the Department of Defense Medal for Distinguished Public Service by Acting Secretary of Defense Christopher C. Miller. Dana Gartzke was named acting in his place at EDA. His White House tenure ended January 20, 2021.

Awards and acknowledgments
 In 2007, Fleming was chosen as the Louisiana Academy of Family Physicians' "Louisiana Family Practice Physician of the Year."
 For both 2010 and 2011, the first two years the award was given, Fleming was given first place by the House Republican Conference in the "New Media Challenge" for highest performance in the then new digital/social media platform.
 In 2014, For his work on religious freedom and material support of the military chaplaincy during his tenure on the House Armed Services Committee, Fleming was given the first ever Torchbearer for Religious Freedom award by the Chaplain Alliance for Religious Liberty.
 In 2014, Fleming was given the North American Migratory Bird Joint Venture Champion award for a Legislator by the Association of Joint Venture Management Boards and Ducks Unlimited.
 On August 22, 2019, Fleming was given the Distinguished Alumnus of the Year Award by the University of Mississippi Medical Center.
 In January 2021, Fleming was given the Department of Defense Medal for Distinguished Public Service by Acting Secretary of Defense Christopher C. Miller.

See also
 Physicians in the United States Congress

References

External links

1951 births
Living people
21st-century American politicians
Activists from California
American coroners
American family and parenting writers
American health care businesspeople
American primary care physicians
Baptists from Louisiana
Baptists from Mississippi
Politicians from Charleston, South Carolina
People from Long Beach, California
Politicians from Meridian, Mississippi
Politicians from Minden, Louisiana
Republican Party members of the United States House of Representatives from Louisiana
Sons of the American Revolution
Southern Baptists
Tea Party movement activists
United States Department of Commerce officials
United States Navy Medical Corps officers
University of Mississippi alumni
Military personnel from California
Candidates in the 2016 United States Senate elections